Martin Ney (born 12 December 1970) is a German serial killer. He wore a mask while killing three and sexually assaulting at least 40 children in school camps. He also did some of his activities in camps, private homes and other places. Ney, who committed his first act in 1992, was also known as the "Masked Man" and the "Black Man". After his arrest on 15 April 2011, the 40-year-old educator confessed to three murders, but is suspected of two others. Ney was sentenced on 27 February 2012 by the Stade district court, among other things, for three murders to life imprisonment. The court also noted the particular severity of the guilt.

Crimes 
In 1992, a series of abuse began on boys, mainly in northern Germany. Ney, who was described as tall and strong, always attacked at night, masked in school homes, camps and youth homes. From 1994, he began to break into single-family homes.

Ney also committed three murders in northern Germany, in addition to about 45 attempted or completed abuse offenses. In the case of two more homicides in western France and the Netherlands, he is considered a suspect. The three year rhythm (1992, 1995, 1998, 2001, 2004) of the alleged murder series is particularly striking.

School Home Attacks

Children's home in Hepstedt 
On 3 March 1992, a student discovered a masked man in an empty dormitory of a children's home in Hepstedt, who fled shortly thereafter through a patio door. A few days later, the man tried to abuse an 11-year-old boy, but fled when he began to scream. Between April and June 1992, the masked man was seen twice by students before one night in August, when he woke up several children and touched them inappropriately. In September, the stranger approached a boy's bed and asked him to undress. On an October night, the masked man spoke to five children in a row, of which he then abused three. After these incidents, a motion detector was installed in the school camp and the door locking system was renewed.

Schullandheim Badenstadt 
Also in March 1992, a series of similar incidents began in Schullandheim Badenstadt in Zeven, when a stranger tried to abuse a 13-year-old at night. In August of the same year, the probably-same perpetrator snuck into a toilet with a 10-year-old boy. In September 1992, he touched a 9-year-old inappropriately, after he had carried him from his bed into an adjoining room. In May 1994, the alleged serial offender abused an 11-year-old and almost exactly a year later, he repeated the crime on a 10-year-old boy. In October 1995, he tried to touch a 13-year-old, but fled when he sat down close to his classmates. In June 1998, he struck in Badenstadt for the last time, when he tried to touch two boys, who resisted his advances.

Schullandheim Wulsbüttel – Murder of Dennis Klein (2001) 
In June 1995, the perpetrator abused a 10-year-old exchange student in Wulsbüttel and fled through a room window. In July 1999, the man awoke an 8-year-old boy, took him to the house's basement and abused him. On 5 September 2001, 9-year-old Dennis Klein disappeared from his room at night. Fourteen days later the boy was found murdered, by a mushroom picker in a dense shrubbery on a forest road between Kirchtimke and Hepstedt.

Other crimes in school homes – Murders of Stefan Jahr (1992) and Jonathan Coulom (2004) 
In March 1992, a teacher in the hallway of the Schullandheim Cluvenhagen saw a man carrying a drowsy boy who did not resist. When the offender noticed the teacher, he fled. In the early morning of 31 March 1992, 13-year-old Stefan Jahr disappeared from a boarding school in Scheeßel. Five weeks later, his body was found buried with his hands tied behind his back in the Verden dunes. On 7 April 2004, 11-year-old Jonathan Coulom disappeared from a school home in Saint-Brevin-les-Pins in western France. In May, his undressed, handcuffed body weighted with a concrete block was found in a pond about 30 kilometres away. Ney is said to have been close to the scene of the crime in May 2004.

Tent camp attacks – Murder of Dennis Rostel (1995) 
This crime spree began in August 1992, when a masked offender sexually abused a 9-year-old and another child in a camp near Selker Noor. In July 1994, the perpetrator entered two tents, one after another, in a camp in Otterndorf and awoke seven boys aged between 8 and 9, which he touched inappropriately. At the end of August 1994, a 13-year-old boy woke up in the Selker Noor camp when the offender began touching him. After about ten minutes, the masked man disappeared. Two days later, the man again touched another 13-year-old in Selker Noor. During the night of 24 July 1995, 8-year-old Dennis Rostel disappeared from the camp. Two weeks later, German tourists found his body buried in a sand dune near Vinderup in Denmark.

Family house attacks 
In April 1994, a masked offender broke into several single-family houses in the Bremen area, especially in the Horn-Lehe district, and abused three boys. The actions differed in detail and approach from the usual attacks, however, according to the investigators it was the same masked offender. The police, despite the insistence of parents, issued no public warning.

Chronological overview of the acts 
The list includes the crimes that were attributed to the masked man even before Ney's arrest. The investigation after the arrest and also the process gave indications of further cases of abuse. Some acts, including the murder of Jonathan Coulom, were denied by Ney and so far could not be proven.

Investigations 
In connection to the murder of Dennis Klein, a special commission as formed by the Verden an der Aller police (SoKo "Dennis"). In the context of the investigation, the murders and, sometimes unknown to the investigating authorities, cases of abuse could be put into narrower context and assigned them to an alleged perpetrator based on testimonies and almost identical facts. The Bavarian Landeskriminalamt supported SoKo "Dennis" by creating offender profiling.

Offender description 
According to a case analysis by Alexander Horn, the offender was said to be a strikingly tall, stocky man with a deep voice speaking German, between the ages of 30 and 50. He was supposedly well versed in Northern Germany, especially in the area around Bremen, and possibly lived there. He should have had a reference to the area around the towns of Hepstedt and Badenstedt in the early 1990s.

In his actions, the man wore dark clothes, a mask and gloves, succeeding in intimidating children. Initially described as athletic, the perpetrator put on weight over the years. He was mostly travelling by car and seemed to have experience with children. It was assumed that he lived alone and was socially integrated, but had pedophilic tendencies towards boys, a fact possibly noticed by family and close friends.

Also striking was the certain risk-taking of the offender, who exposed himself to many crime scenes where there was a possibility of discovery. In addition, he had transported the three German murder victims over long distances by car, and in the case of Dennis Rostel, even more than 250 kilometres over the guarded border in Denmark. Nevertheless, he had always managed to leave hardly any traces. The investigators, therefore, theorized that he was a smart offender who probably carried out his actions in a familiar environment and previously planned accordingly.

According to criminologist Stephan Harbort, the perpetrator was classified as extremely dangerous: '"This is a person with high levels of planning ability. He is able to gain the trust of children. Those who have the discipline to do so for twelve years have reached a stage where there is no longer any inhibition to kill. Such a person no longer kills just children. As a banal quarrel with any ordinary person can be enough to commit murder."

Search 
Despite checking all relatives and acquaintances of the victims and a mass DNA testing of hundreds of men from northern Germany, Ney was initially undetected. Special commissions from Germany, France and the Netherlands worked closely together in the case.

In addition, reports of the crimes were broadcast three times on Aktenzeichen XY… ungelöst, but without receiving any crucial information from the spectators.

The police went after about 7,800 clues, without any breakthrough. In August 2010, a witness who had seen an old documentary on the internet about the murders contacted police. He claimed to have seen the culprit along with the victim Dennis Klein in the car on a forest path in the early morning while he was running track near the abduction site. A "situation sketch" was prepared and published on 10 February 2011.

Arrest 
On 15 April 2011, police announced the arrest of a suspect. The crucial clue had come from an earlier victim who had been abused by a masked offender in his childhood home in 1995 and who had recalled in the February 2011 sketch that it was the same man who abused him. The then 40-year-old Martin Ney, who had lived in Bremen until September 2000, made a confession after the first interrogations. He admitted to killing Jahr, Rostel and Klein and abusing about 40 other children. He was also suspected of murdering Coulom and Dutch boy Nicky Verstappen, but he denied this. In 2020, a Dutch man was convicted of kidnapping and sexual abuse leading to Verstappen's death in 1998.

Investigation 
During his interrogation, Ney stated that he had committed the three murders in order to cover up the sexual abuse and not be identified as a culprit. According to him, he strangled Jahr because he had taken him in his car and feared that the boy might have noted his license plate number. He also claimed to have spent a few days on holiday with Dennis Rostel in a holiday home near Holstebro in Denmark, before he strangled him. Ney also smothered Klein because he defended himself against the abuse loudly.

Even before his arrest, Ney was suspected by police for several reasons. After he had threatened two parents from Bremen with kidnapping and killing their children at the age of 17.  In 1989, he was convicted for the extortion of 150,000 Deutsche Mark under juvenile criminal law for performing charitable work.

When his criminal record was wiped from the educational register at the age of 24, Ney applied for a foster son in 1995 at the Social Services Office in Bremen. The young, single student who at this time lived in a Bundesausbildungsförderungsgesetz studio making 870 Deutsche Mark (approx. US$1,1500 in 2022). Though regarded as an unusual candidate for such a role, the youth welfare office accepted him as a foster father due to the small number of available foster parents.

A guardianship judge of the district court of Bremen-Blumenthal, in front of whom Ney had previously appeared as a teenager because of the attempted extortion, spoke twice to the child killer in 1996, granting him custody of the 12-year-old boy. The boy lived with Ney until he was old enough to leave, but was never sexually abused by him.

After completing his teaching studies, Ney broke off the subsequent legal clerkship before the second state examination and applied in 2000 with falsified university certificates as a social education teacher in a daycare position at a Hamburg foundation, which he held until early 2008. Already in the years before, Ney had worked as a youth worker in addition to his studies and had thus become familiar with some of his victims and locations.

In 2005, he was charged with sexual abuse in two minor cases, but the case closed against payment of 1,800 euros. In 2006, Ney threatened to report a social worker from Berlin for possession of child pornography, and demanded 20,000 euros for his silence. Then he was sentenced in the same year for attempted extortion and sentenced to ten months probation.

As part of this investigation, the police searched  Ney's apartment and secured his computer, which, among other things, contained about 30,000 photos with child pornographic representations. Since it could not be clarified when the images were stored and when the last access was made, the prosecutor stopped the proceedings because of presumed statute of limitations ending in 2007. It was not recognized that some of the photos taken in the exhibit of the Hamburg police were former victims.

In December 2007, Ney was first interviewed by SoKo "Dennis", since he was found to match the offender's profile. He denied any sexual references to children. The request for a saliva sample, which he did not comply for in 2008, could not be enforced legally due to lack of sufficient suspicion.

After his arrest, Ney's computer was confiscated again, with his new tenant having discovered in November 2011 several storage media, which were hidden under a hood in his former apartment. Investigators were unable to find the password and view the data they had saved. Ney refused to provide his password, pointing to the protection of his friends and family. The likelihood of being able to decrypt complex access codes without his help was considered low, despite the state-of-the-art technology. At the end of 2016, Ney voluntarily named the passwords to the authorities. As of May 2017, the evaluation of the now-usable data carries was not yet completed.

In January 2021, Ney was extradited to Nantes, France after he was charged with the murder of Coulom.

Sentencing 
On 15 July 2011, the prosecution filed charges against Ney for threefold murder and sexual abuse in 20 cases. Around 20 more cases of abuse were already barred. On 10 October, the trial began before the district court of Stade, where the defendant showed constant. Psychological evaluations diagnosed him a pedophilic disorder, but also noted that he was not insane and was a continuing danger with a risk of relapse. During the trial, there were indications of further acts of abuse in the 2000s and thus, an increased probability of recidivism.

On 27 February 2012, Ney was sentenced to life imprisonment for the murder of the three boys and 20 abuse cases, with subsequent preventative detention condemned. In addition, the court noted the particular severity of the guilt. However, Ney's defenders appealed the verdict regarding the preventative detention.

On 10 January 2013, the Federal Court of Justice (BGH) took place and canceled the preventative detention. This was justified by the statement that according to the current legal situation, the preventative detention can only be ordered to an indispensable protection of the general public. Since the BGH has confirmed the particular severity of the guilt, the minimum term of imprisonment of 15 years, which is usual for life imprisonment, will be extended. In addition, a discharge can only be carried out as a result of the demonstrable harmlessness of the convicted person. However, such proof would also suspend the execution of the preventative detention. Otherwise, it can be assumed that Ney will remain in custody, possibly until the end of his life.

Reception 
 In the episode "Scream of the geese" on the Radio-Retort program on Radio Bremen this case was partially covered.
 ZDF filmed the story under the title In the Name of My Son, directed by Damir Lukacevic with Tobias Moretti and Inka Friedrich in the lead roles. Shooting began on 20 March 2015, and the broadcast took place on 2 May 2016.

External links 
 Official site of the police of Lower Saxony to SoKo "Dennis" (archived from 1 July 2011 on the Internet Archive)
 Confession of the child murderer in: Spiegel TV magazine of 14 August 2011 (15 minutes)
 Child murderer Martin N.: What became of the "Masked Man"? in: Spiegel Online on 14 April 2016, accessed on 16 April 2016

See also 
 List of German serial killers

References 

1970 births
German murderers of children
German people convicted of murder
German prisoners sentenced to life imprisonment
German rapists
German serial killers
Living people
Male serial killers
People convicted of murder by Germany
People from Bremen
Prisoners sentenced to life imprisonment by Germany
Violence against men in Europe